Barry Palmer (born 1958) is an English singer. He was a replacement for singer Helmut Köllen in the German band Triumvirat in 1976, and appeared on the albums Old Loves Die Hard and Pompeii in 1977. He later joined Mike Oldfield on his Discovery album in 1984, sharing vocals with Maggie Reilly. He has also released two solo albums.

Biography and career
Born in Worcestershire, England, Palmer began his singing career in the early 1970s when he joined Scarborough-based band Brave New World as their lead singer. Brave New World were a five-piece band who played all their own original material but were also influenced by bands such as Family, Fairport Convention and Wishbone Ash.

After Brave New World disbanded in 1972/73, Palmer pursued a solo singing career and released his first single titled "Always". This was quickly followed up with the release of a second single titled "Getaway" in 1974, which was influenced by the style of T. Rex.

In 1974, Palmer sang lead and backing vocals on the British and European chart hit "The Bump", although he did not make public appearances alongside the other performers, the London group Kenny.

In return, Palmer wanted to release a single himself and therefore recorded a cover of Paul McCartney's "Maybe I'm Amazed" under the stage/release name of DC Palmer. Both songs were released, but while "Maybe I'm Amazed" failed to chart, "The Bump" eventually reached No. 3 in the UK Singles Chart.

Palmer then began writing his own material and, shortly afterwards, answered an ad in magazine Melody Maker placed by Jürgen Fritz whose hugely successful German progressive rock band Triumvirat were looking for a new lead vocalist, as their lead singer had just quit the band. Palmer sent Jürgen a demo tape of his single "Maybe I'm Amazed". Consequently, Palmer secured the vacant position as lead singer with Triumvirat. Triumvirat's first song recorded together with Palmer was "Take a Break Today" (1975). This was then followed up by the band's fifth album Pompeii, again featuring Palmer on lead vocals.

After he left the band, Palmer stayed in Germany, recording and touring with other similar and notable German Progressive Rock Groups such as Satin Whale and Gänsehaut. It was in 1983 that Mike Oldfield heard one of Triumvirat's albums and invited Palmer to join his Crises album tour, an offer Palmer refused as, at that time, he was working on his forthcoming solo album, Without an Aim.

In 1984, Palmer released two further singles, "She's Leaving Home", a Beatles cover that he had recorded whilst in Germany with the assistance of Jürgen Fritz (Triumvirat), followed by "When One Door Closes", a track from Without an Aim. Later that same year Mike Oldfield again contacted Palmer and asked him to sing on his new track, "Crime of Passion".

Alternating with Maggie Reilly, Palmer sang every other song, on Mike Oldfield's Discovery album, appearing on "Pictures in the Dark", "Tricks of the Light", "Saved by a Bell" and "Discovery". Three further tracks from Palmer with Mike Oldfield followed. "Poison Arrows" was released commercially, but the other two songs were only recorded as demos and were never released.

Around the same time, and under the duo name of Cover Up, Palmer dueted with John Payne of Asia on songs titled "Love The One You're With" and "Feel the Fire", written by Stephen Stills and Palmer/Payne respectively.

After his period with Mike Oldfield, Palmer decided to focus on his own solo career. He released his solo album Without an Aim in 1985. Around the same time, he also released a cover version of Manfred Mann's "Doo Wah Diddy Diddy" as a single, with his own song "Spirit of America" on the B-side.

1987 saw the further release of an EP by Palmer entitled "Shimmering Gold" / "Unknown Singer" which had previously been recorded in Germany with the assistance of Jürgen Fritz. In the same year, he also released his own version of "House of the Rising Sun" (extended & edited versions) which was then quickly followed by "God Bless the Children" b/w "Somebody Sing My Song". "God Bless the Children" was also selected to be sung by all the (1987) Miss World contestants that same year whilst they were appearing at the Royal Albert Hall in London.

1988 saw Palmer coming to notice as a music producer with his own record label Pyramid Records. His most notable success during this period was when he produced the UK hit "Lies" b/w "I Need Experience" for Amanda Scott (real name Avis Hopkins, the youngest sister of Bonnie Tyler).

Between 1990/1994, Barry Palmer continued performing live and was the lead singer with a blues rock band called Jonesville. The mid- and late nineties (1995/2000) again saw Palmer performing live as lead vocalist with several London-based function bands such as The Wedge and Nightshift. 2000/2001 saw Palmer release a single entitled "Dear John" b/w "Ghost of a Love".

2012 saw Barry Palmer release his latest single, "Innocent". This was to be followed (September 2012) by his latest studio album titled Night Thoughts, with all tracks written by Palmer and his London-based close friend and songwriting partner, Dave Duncan.

Personal life 
Palmer was married, and has three children.

Discography

Albums
With Triumvirat:
 Old Loves Die Hard (1976)
 Pompeii (1977)
 À La Carte (1978)

With Satin Whale:
 Don’t Stop the Show (1980/81)

As Barry Palmer:
 Without An Aim (1985)
 Night Thoughts (2012)

With Mike Oldfield:
 Discovery (1984/85)

Various Artists Featuring Barry Palmer, Mickey Simmonds And Tom Newman
 A Tribute To Mike Oldfield (2000)

Singles/EPs
As Barry Joe Palmer:
 "Always" (1973)
 "Getaway" (1973)

Barry Palmer as Kenny:
 "The Bump" (1974)

Barry Palmer as DC Palmer:
 "Maybe I’m Amazed" (1975)

With Triumvirat:
 "The Hymn" (1977)
 "Take a Break Today" / "The Capitol of Power" (2000)

With Gaensehaut:
 "Mr America" (1980)

With Satin Whale:
 "Don’t Stop the Show" / "Girl" (1980/81)

With Mike Oldfield (1984 / 1985):
 "Crime of Passion"
 "Pictures in the Dark"
 "Tricks of the Light"
 "Saved By A Bell"
 "Discovery"
 "Poison Arrows"
 "When the Nights on Fire" (Demo)
 "Man in the Rain" (Demo)

Barry Palmer as Cover Up:
 "Love the One You're With" / "Feel the Fire" (1985)

As Barry Palmer:
 "She's Leaving Home" (1983)
 "When One Door Closes" (1984)
 "When One Door Closes" (1985)
 "Doo Wah Diddy Diddy" / "Spirit of America" (1986)
 "Shimmering Gold" / "Unknown Singer" (1987)
 "House of the Rising Sun" (1987)
 "God Bless The Children" / "Somebody Sing My Song" (1987)
 "Dear John" / "Ghost of a Love" (2000/01)
 "Innocent" (2012)

Barry Palmer as Producer / Record Label: (for Amanda Scott)
 "Lies" / "I Need Experience" (1988)

References
 Triumvirat - Official Homepage
 Barry Palmer
 Various Featuring Barry Palmer, Mickey Simmonds And Tom Newman (2) - A Tribute To Mike Oldfield

English male singers
1958 births
Living people